Ira Daniel MacIntosh, also known as Mark MacIntosh, (April 12, 1903 – October 13, 1973) was an American football player and coach of football and basketball.  He played college football at Rhode Island State College—now known as the University of Rhode Island—and professionally in the National Football League (NFL) with the Providence Steam Roller, in 1925 and 1926.  McIntosh served as the head football coach at Lake Forest College from 1929 to 1932, Arizona State Teacher's College at Flagstaff—now known as Northern Arizona University—from 1933 to 1935, and Swarthmore College from 1936 to 1937, compiling a career college football coaching record of 24–29–11.  He was also the head basketball coach at Lake Forest from 1929 to 1932, tallying a mark of 16–30.

Head coaching record

College football

References

External links
 
 

1903 births
1973 deaths
Lake Forest Foresters football coaches
Lake Forest Foresters men's basketball coaches
Northern Arizona Lumberjacks football coaches
Rhode Island Rams football players
Swarthmore Garnet Tide athletic directors
Swarthmore Garnet Tide football coaches
Swarthmore Garnet Tide men's basketball coaches
Providence Steam Roller players
Coaches of American football from Rhode Island
Players of American football from Providence, Rhode Island
Basketball coaches from Rhode Island